is a railway station planned to be constructed on the Hokkaido Shinkansen in the city of Otaru, Hokkaido, Japan. Scheduled to open in 2031, it will be operated by Hokkaido Railway Company (JR Hokkaido).

Lines

See also
 List of railway stations in Japan

References

Railway stations in Hokkaido Prefecture
Stations of Hokkaido Railway Company
Hokkaido Shinkansen